John Ertzgaard (born June 18, 1977, in Nairobi, Kenya) is a Kenyan-Norwegian former athlete who specialized in the sprinting events.

His father is Norwegian and his mother is Ugandan. His mother, a member of the Lango people, had escaped to Kenya as a refugee during Idi Amin's reign in Uganda. Ertzgaard's father worked for the development agency Norad, and the family lived in Kenya and Zambia before they moved to Norway when Ertzgaard was nine.

His only major medal was the gold in 200 meters at the 1999 European U23 Championships. He competed at the 2000 Olympic Games in Sydney without advancing to the second round. The biggest success of his career was reaching the semifinals of the 1999 World Championships in Seville.

Competition record

Personal Best
Outdoor
100 m – 10.25 (Edmonton 2001)
200 m – 20.47 (Gothenburg 1999)
400 m – 46.80 (2001)

Indoor
60 m – 6.70 (Vienna 2002)
100 m – 10.47 (Tampere 2000)
200 m – 21.08 (Gothenburg 2000)

References

External links
 

1977 births
Living people
Norwegian male sprinters
Athletes (track and field) at the 2000 Summer Olympics
Olympic athletes of Norway
Sportspeople from Nairobi
Norwegian people of Ugandan descent
Norwegian expatriates in Kenya
Norwegian expatriates in Zambia
Kenyan people of Ugandan descent
Kenyan people of Norwegian descent
Kenyan emigrants to Norway